Truth or Dare is a 2017 American supernatural horror television film directed by Nick Simon and written by Thommy Hutson and Ethan Lawrence. The film stars Cassie Scerbo, Brytni Sarpy, Mason Dye, Harvey Guillen, Luke Baines, Ricardo Hoyos, Alexxis Lemire, Christina Masterson as eight teenagers forced to play a deadly game of truth or dare by a vengeful spirit, and as Heather Langenkamp as a survivor of the game from decades earlier. The film premiered on Syfy on October 8, 2017. It received negative reviews from critics.

The plot focuses on a group of eight college students who rent a haunted house on Halloween that is said to be haunted by a vengeful spirit after losing a deadly game of truth or dare many years beforehand. The group decide to play the game and are forced to follow through in answering humiliating truths honestly, act upon each increasingly alarming dare asking them to do violent things to themselves or others, or face deadly consequences.

Plot 

In 1983, Donna Boone tells her friend Johnny Milsner to jump off the roof to complete the game of Truth or Dare, causing him to roll off to his death. Horrified, Donna returns inside the house to find writing on a mirror telling her to pour acid on her head. After first covering her head in a paste of baking soda and water, she does so, completing the dare.

In the present day, a group of eight friends – Carter Boyle, Maddie Sotarez, Tyler Pemhart, Alex Colshis, Jessie Havnell, Addison Troy, Holt Thorne, and Luke Wyler – go to a house Carter has rented for a Halloween outing. Carter, a film student who documents much of their experience on camera, tells the group that the house became haunted after seven teens played truth or dare in 1983 and all but one died horribly, and the survivor was never seen again. Carter persuades everyone to play Truth or Dare in the same house. Things quickly turn sour when Maddie is asked if she had sex with Tyler, Alex's boyfriend. Although she tries to lie, a mysterious group text forces her to tell the truth. Tyler's dare is to put his hands on a hot stove and is told to 'do the dare or the dare does you', and although he attempts to quit, a chair moves by itself and trips him onto the stove, severely burning his hand.

The group angrily accuses Carter of fabricating everything, which he vehemently denies. An old-fashioned television displays a warning that the group has 48 hours to complete three rounds of the game. They try to leave, but the doors and windows close, trapping everyone in. Jessie, a vegan, is dared to eat Tyler's burnt skin from the stove, and after eating one piece, the phone rings with the message for her to eat all of it. Holt is dared to grab onto exposed wiring. To keep him from getting electrocuted, Carter rushes at him with a blanket to push him from the wires. Luke is dared to smash his knee, which Carter does for him. Addison is asked if she's an addict. She insists that she isn't, and then tries to leave the house. A mysterious force shoves her off of the porch and onto an exposed pipe, killing her.

At the hospital, the group tries telling the police what happened, but are met with skepticism. The next day, the ghost of Addison appears in Carter's dorm room and dares him to hang himself for two minutes, with a noose falling out of the ceiling. Carter tries to leave, but the ghost and noose capture him and hang him once his time runs out. After being sent a livestream of the dare, Alex, Maddie, Tyler, and Holt race to Carter's room, but are unable to open the door in time. The four friends see a message that Round Two is beginning. Meanwhile, Alex's research into the haunted history of the house leads her to Donna Boone, the lone survivor of Truth or Dare in 1983. Donna tells them that the 'demon' running the game feeds on fear and pain, and that they will have to finish the game inside the house in order to survive. She also suggests sharing their dares to outsmart the demon.

In his bedroom, Luke receives a dare to rob a gas station, and a gun appears on his bed. He pulls up at the gas station with Jessie on the passenger seat and attempts the robbery, but the cashier ends up killing Luke with a shotgun. Shocked, Jessie calls Alex to tell her that Luke was shot during the robbery, and Alex tells her to meet back at the house. Once Jessie returns, the group heads inside, and Tyler receives a dare to drink a liquid poison. He shares the dare with everyone and they all first drink soda, then drink the poison and vomit it up. Maddie receives a dare to pull two teeth out. Tyler, a medical student, extracts one tooth from her, and one from himself. Alex receives a dare to play three rounds of Russian roulette, with Alex surviving the first two and Tyler fatally shooting himself in the head on the third round.

Holt receives a dare to be run over by a car, and confesses to the others that he once paralyzed someone in a hit-and-run accident, but escaped without consequence. Jessie tries to run over Holt's foot, but the car won't start, and when Holt opens the hood to fix the starter, the hood slams on his hand and time runs out. The car, driving itself, pulls him in reverse until he falls, then runs him over, crushing him to death. Heading back into the house, Alex realizes that the spirit is punishing them for their obsessions and sins.

Jessie is dared to chain herself to a pipe in the cellar, but runs out of time and is devoured by a huge swarm of cockroaches. As Round Three begins, Maddie receives a phone call instructing her and Alex to remove seven living body parts. Between them, they remove an eyelash, hair, a fingernail, an earlobe, a finger, and a toe. As their last part, Alex chops off Maddie's foot with a cleaver. After completing the dare, they rush to the hospital, but a message appears on the car's GPS with Alex's final dare – "kill her". Maddie begs Alex to kill her, but Alex refuses, and intentionally crashes the car into a tree. An unknown survivor gasps for air after the screen cuts to black.

Cast
 Cassie Scerbo as Alex Colshis
 Brytni Sarpy as Maddie Sotarez
 Mason Dye as Tyler Pemhart
 Harvey Guillen as Holt Thorne
 Luke Baines as Carter Boyle
 Ricardo Hoyos as Luke Wyler
 Alexxis Lemire as Jessie Havnell
 Christina Masterson as Addison Troy
 Heather Langenkamp as Donna Boone
 Taylor Lyons as Young Donna Boone
 Jonathan Mercedes as Johnny Milsner

Casting
Scerbo was cast in the role of Alex after several auditions. She described the character as "smart, quick and driven."

Donna Boone
Heather Langenkamp, a longtime friend of the writer Thommy Hutson, was approached to portray the grown version of Donna. Langenkamp's first steps before filming were to get a life cast of her face for Donna's disfigurement, which she found to add a lot of depth to Donna. She later had discussions with Hutson to add further characterization to the character, deciding that she did jigsaw puzzles to deal with her overt loneliness.

Release 
The film premiered on Syfy on October 8, 2017.

, the film is estimated to have grossed $6,871 from DVD and Blu-ray sales.

Reception 
The film received negative reviews from critics. It has a 0% fresh rating on review aggregator Rotten Tomatoes, based on six reviews. Joey Keogh of Wicked Horror wrote that the film "is too safe to really commit to the darkness and instead leaves one wondering why it really needs to exist in the first place."

Timothy Rawles of iHorror argued that the film shouldn't be dismissed, praising its acting, direction, and special effects. "Truth or Dare is fun as soon as it reels you in and that's pretty much from the get-go," he wrote.

References

External links 
 

2017 horror films
2010s ghost films
2017 independent films
2010s teen horror films
American ghost films
American independent films
American supernatural horror films
American haunted house films
American teen horror films
CineTel Films films
Films about games
American films about revenge
Films set in 1983
Films set in 2017
American horror television films
Syfy original films
Halloween horror films
2017 films
2010s English-language films
2010s American films